Frontenac is the second largest city in Crawford County, Kansas, United States.  As of the 2020 census, the population of the city was 3,382.

History
Frontenac was established as a coal mining town in 1886 in the Cherokee-Crawford Coal Fields in the western Ozark Plateau.

A post office was opened in Frontenac in 1887.

On the night of November 9, 1888, Frontenac had the worst mining disaster in Kansas history, when a coal dust explosion killed 44 miners.

During the last decade of the nineteenth century and in the early twentieth century the town was populated primarily by immigrant families from eastern and southeastern Europe, predominantly Sicilian, Italian, and Slavic people from the Austro-Hungarian Empire. Its maximum population neared 4,000. It housed various ethnic lodges and drinking parlors despite the state's increasingly severe ban on the distribution, sale, and manufacture of alcoholic beverages.

Coal mining remained the town's occupational base until World War II, when its economy began to change, as did the entire region's.

Geography
Frontenac is located at  (37.454465, -94.695185) in the Cherokee Lowlands, at the western edge of the Ozarks.

Climate
The climate in this area is characterized by hot, humid summers and generally mild to cool winters.  According to the Köppen Climate Classification system, Frontenac has a humid subtropical climate, abbreviated "Cfa" on climate maps.

Demographics

2010 census
As of the census of 2010, there were 3,437 people, 1,391 households, and 893 families residing in the city. The racial makeup of the city was 95.5% White, 0.5% African American, 0.5% Native American, 0.7% Asian, 0.2% Pacific Islander, 0.6% from other races, and 1.9% from two or more races. Hispanic or Latino of any race were 2.1% of the population.

There were 1,391 households, of which 32.2% had children under the age of 18 living with them, 48.0% were married couples living together, 11.5% had a female householder with no husband present, 4.7% had a male householder with no wife present, and 35.8% were non-families. 30.6% of all households were made up of individuals, and 15.9% had someone living alone who was 65 years of age or older. The average household size was 2.40 and the average family size was 3.00.

The median age in the city was 40.1 years. 24.2% of residents were under the age of 18; 7.7% were between the ages of 18 and 24; 24.4% were from 25 to 44; 24.2% were from 45 to 64; and 19.6% were 65 years of age or older. The gender makeup of the city was 46.3% male and 53.7% female.

2000 census
As of the census of 2000, there were 2,996 people, 1,230 households, and 783 families residing in the city.currently as of 2004 the population is 3,079 . The racial makeup of the city was 97.70% White, 0.20% African American, 0.70% Native American, 0.07% Asian, 0.43% from other races, and 0.90% from two or more races. Hispanic or Latino of any race were 0.73% of the population.

There were 1,230 households, out of which 29.3% had children under the age of 18 living with them, 51.5% were married couples living together, 8.5% had a female householder with no husband present, and 36.3% were non-families. 32.0% of all households were made up of individuals, and 17.2% had someone living alone who was 65 years of age or older. The average household size was 2.33 and the average family size was 2.94.

In the city, the population was spread out, with 23.5% under the age of 18, 8.5% from 18 to 24, 24.9% from 25 to 44, 21.3% from 45 to 64, and 21.8% who were 65 years of age or older. The median age was 40 years. For every 100 females, there were 81.4 males. For every 100 females age 18 and over, there were 76.1 males.

The median income for a household in the city was $33,558, and the median income for a family was $42,214. Males had a median income of $30,474 versus $21,163 for females. The per capita income for the city was $17,349. About 4.4% of families and 7.7% of the population were below the poverty line, including 5.6% of those under age 18 and 9.6% of those age 65 or over.

Area events
Festa Italiana, A Taste of Nations is an annual festival held to celebrate the city's heritage.  It hosts many different cooks, and patrons can sample foods from family recipes ranging from many different European heritages.  Festa Italiana is held near the Frontenac Sports Complex each fall.  Nearly 3,000 people attend Festa yearly.

Frontenac Town Homecoming is an event in which the Frontenac area celebrates the town's establishment.  It is complete with a large parade, food vendors, beer & wine tents, children's games, contests & tournaments, fishing derby, pool games, and a Street Dance in the evening.  In 2016, community leaders created the Frontenac Heritage Hall, a museum of photo collections and memorabilia from Frontenac's foundation in 1886 to present.  It is located in downtown Frontenac, at the corner of McKay and Crawford Streets.  Most events are held in downtown Frontenac (with fishing derby held at Frontenac City Park, pool games held at Frontenac City Pool), and celebrated in late May or early June.

Parks and recreation
Frontenac Rotary Park is located east of downtown Frontenac, and is filled with state-of-the-art playground equipment, a skate park, and shelter houses for gatherings.

Frontenac City Park is located on the north edge of town, home to several deep fishing pits.

Frontenac Sports Complex, located on the east end of town, is home to a brand new football stadium & track, several baseball & softball diamonds, and a cross-country path.The sports complex is home to the Raiders & Lady Raiders for football, baseball, softball, cross-country, and track & field.

Frontenac Municipal Swimming Pool is located east of Rotary Park.

Frontenac Recreation Center is located in downtown Frontenac, and has state-of-the-art lifting & running machines, in addition to free-weights and biking machines.

Senior Citizens Center, located north of downtown Frontenac.

A brand new hitting facility for baseball and softball players opened up in the parking lot of the football stadium.

Government
Frontenac is governed by a City Council and Mayor. Each is elected every two years. James Kennedy served as Mayor from 1997 to 2018, when the town elected Linda Grilz, its first ever female Mayor.

Education

Primary and secondary education
Frontenac is served by Unified School District 249.  The district serves primarily in east-central Crawford County, and parts of west-central Barton County, Missouri.  It consists of three schools in the city of Frontenac: 
 Frontenac High School (Grades 9-12), located at 201 S. Crawford St.
 Frontenac Middle School (Grades 6–8), located at 201 S. Cayuga St.
 Frank Layden Elementary School (Grades Pre-K-5), located at 200 E. Lanyon St.

Frontenac High School competes as Class 4A.  The mascot is the Raider & Lady Raider, and the colors are black, silver, & white.  It is the second largest school system in Crawford County, Kansas, with an average district enrollment of about 1,000 students.

Higher education
 Fort Scott Community College - Frontenac Campus.
 Harley Davidson Technician Training Center.
 John Deere Technology Center.

In popular culture
Children's author Clare Vanderpool's book Moon Over Manifest is based on Frontenac.  The 2010 book takes place in fictional Manifest, Kansas in 1936.  The author was born and raised in Wichita, Kansas, but Frontenac is home to her grandparents.  The book was awarded the Newbery Medal in 2011, the Spur Award, and was named a Kansas Notable Book.

Notable people

 Andy Pilney, college football player and coach
 Archie San Romani, world-class distance runner & 1936 U.S. Olympian
 Joe Skubitz, United States congressman
 Douglas Youvan, biophysicist and inventor

References

External links
 City of Frontenac
 Frontenac - Directory of Public Officials
 USD 249, local school district
 Historic Images of Frontenac, Special Photo Collections at Wichita State University Library
 Frontenac city map, KDOT

Cities in Kansas
Cities in Crawford County, Kansas
1886 establishments in Kansas
1888 in the United States
Populated places established in 1886